William Beamont  (1797–1889) was an English solicitor and local philanthropist. He lived in the town of Warrington, in the north-west of England.

Life
Beamont was the first mayor of Warrington after its incorporation as a municipal borough in 1847.  As mayor, he founded its municipal library, the first rate-aided library in the UK, in 1848. He travelled extensively, including in the Holy Land, where he met William Holman Hunt. His diaries, stored in the town's main library, are a valuable source of social history. For many years he lived at Orford Hall. Beamont was a Member of the Chetham Society, and served as Member of Council (1849–82) and Vice-President (1879–82). He was also a Fellow of the Society of Antiquaries of London.

A high school (Beamont Collegiate Academy) and a primary school in the town are named after him.

His grave lies in the churchyard of Christ Church, Padgate, one of several Church of England churches that he helped found.

Family
Beamont married Ann Gaskell (died 1859), daughter of John Gaskell of Warrington. He outlived his only son William John Beamont, who was a clergyman and author.

References

External links

Online Books page

1797 births
1889 deaths
Mayors of Warrington
Record Society of Lancashire and Cheshire
Chetham Society